Thales Alenia Space is a Franco-Italian aerospace manufacturer. A joint venture between the French technology corporation Thales Group (67%) and Italian defense conglomerate Leonardo (33%), the company is the largest satellite manufacturer in Europe. It is headquartered in Cannes, France.

Thales Alenia Space designs and builds various space-related products, notably manufacturing numerous ranges of satellites for telecommunications, navigation, earth observation and space exploration purposes. The company is the second largest industrial participant in the International Space Station (ISS), having produced the European Space Agency's (ESA) modules for the ISS. It is also building satellites for Galileo, a European global satellite navigation system (GSNS).

History 
Thales Alenia Space arose as a result of the French defense electronics specialist Thales Group deciding to buy out the participation of Alcatel in two joint-ventures between France's Alcatel and Italy's Finmeccanica, Alcatel Alenia Space and Telespazio. Accordingly, on 1 June 2005, Alcatel Alenia Space was established by the merger of Alcatel Space and Alenia Spazio; it was initially owned by Alcatel-Lucent (67%) and Finmeccanica (33%). The creation of the company was concurrent with the creation of Telespazio Holding; this too was a merger of Finmeccanica and Alcatel businesses (Telespazio and Alcatel's Space Services and Operations respectively).

On 5 April 2006, Alcatel announced that it intended to sell its share in Alcatel Alenia Space (and its 33% stake in Telespazio) to Thales Group. On 10 April 2007, the European Union, which had performed an in-depth investigation into the proposed transaction over its potential impact on market competition, gave its approval for the transference to proceed. That same day, a Thales Group press release hailed the creation of a new space alliance between itself and Finmeccanica.

According to a statement by Thales UK chief executive Alex Dorrian issued during 2007, Thales Alenia Space has actively sought out opportunities for both partnership and acquisition amongst other space enterprises. In December 2007, it was announced that Thales Alenia Space and Russian satellite specialist NPO PM have agreed to develop the new Express-4000 multi-mission satellite bus, which incorporates Russian equipment with a Thales-built payload. Since then, Thales Alenia Space has developed subcontracting relationships with North American aerospace companies, including Ball Aerospace and Boeing.

Activities 
Thales Alenia Space is a major European satellite specialist. These satellites range in purpose, from telecommunications to navigation, Earth observation and space exploration. Since 2007, the company has been regarded as the largest satellite manufacturer, in both the civilian and military sectors, in Europe.

In the mid-1990s, the United States stopped issuing export licenses for satellite components that will be launched on Chinese rockets, fearing that such launches would help China's military. In response, Thales Alenia developed a line of ITAR-free satellites that contained no restricted U.S. components. Between 2005 and 2012, numerous ITAR-free satellites, such as Apstar 6, Chinasat-6B, and Apstar 7, were launched on Chinese Long March launch vehicles. However, the United States Department of State disputed the ITAR-free status of these satellites, issuing a US$8 million fine to the American company Aeroflex for selling ITAR components. During 2013, Thales Alenia decided to discontinue its ITAR-free satellite line.

A major proportion of Thales Alenia Space's business is centered around the production of communications satellites, in which it is a world leader. During 2010, Thales Alenia Space received a US$2.9 billion fixed-price contract to manufacture a total of 81 satellites for Iridium Communications' NEXT satellite telephony network. It is also engaged in producing a separate batch of 24 satellites for Globalstar's second generation network. The firm is also responsible for producing satellites for Galileo, a European global satellite navigation system (GSNS).

The company constructed the Multi-Purpose Logistics Modules, which were used to transport cargo inside the Space Shuttle orbiters. Thales Alenia Space also built several modules for the International Space Station (ISS): the Cupola, the Columbus, Harmony, Tranquility and Leonardo. After the American aerospace corporation Boeing, Thales Alenia Space was the second largest industrial provider to the ISS. It also built the pressure vessels for the Automated Transfer Vehicle (ATV) and Cygnus spacecraft. During the 2010s, Thales Alenia Space manufactured the Intermediate eXperimental Vehicle (IXV), a prototype suborbital spaceplane intended to validate work towards reusable launcher systems, acting as a stepping stone towards the Programme for Reusable In-orbit Demonstrator in Europe (PRIDE program) and the consequential Space Rider that harnesses IPX technology. It has also engaged with other space exploration efforts, such as proposed lunar cargo landing vehicle.

Locations 
In 2016, Thales Alenia Space had 7,980 employees and from 2016 operates in 17 industrial sites located in eight countries (France, Italy, Spain, Belgium, United Kingdom, Germany, Switzerland and United States):
 Cannes, France, hosting also the headquarters in the Cannes Mandelieu Space Center
 L'Aquila, Italy
 Colombes, France
 Florence, Italy
Gorgonzola (Milan), Italy
 Rome (Saccomuro), Italy
 Rome (Tiburtina), Italy
 Turin, Italy
 Toulouse, France
 Charleroi, Belgium (Thales Alenia Space ETCA (acronym of « Études Techniques et Constructions Aérospatiales »)
 Madrid (Tres Cantos), Spain
 Stuttgart (Ditzingen), Germany
 Cupertino, United States
 Harwell, United Kingdom
 Bristol, United Kingdom
 Warsaw, Poland
 Zurich, Switzerland

Executive Board 

Current CEO is Hervé Derrey since February 2020, replacing Jean-Loïc Galle.

See also 

 Cannes Mandelieu Space Center
 French space program

References

External links 
 

Spacecraft manufacturers
Space program of France
Privately held companies of France
Thales Group joint ventures
Leonardo S.p.A.
Companies based in Provence-Alpes-Côte d'Azur
Cannes